Marialouis Joseph  is the sixth Bishop of Madurai-Ramnad, serving since his consecration in 2013.

Notes

 
 

21st-century Anglican bishops in India
Indian bishops
Indian Christian religious leaders
Anglican bishops of Madurai-Ramnad
Year of birth missing (living people)
Living people